The Book of Treasures also referred to as Tesoro and Trésor, from its original title in old French "Li livres dou tresor", is a series of manuscripts written by Brunetto Latini, a Florentine politician, poet, historian and philosopher, teacher and friend of Dante Alighieri.

History

This production was written in Langues d'oïl, during the author's exile in France between years 1260 and 1267, because as the author explained, "la parleure est plus delitable et plus comune a touz languaiges" ("It was the most enjoyable and most common spoken language" back in 13th century).

It is a summary of the knowledge of the day. It is regarded as the first encyclopedia written in a modern European language.

The Italian 13th-century translation was misattributed to Bono Giamboni.

The original is held at the National Library of Russia, Saint Petersburg.

Description 

The publication included 298 pages and 155 miniatures. It was originally bound in brown leather with mosaic designs.

It consists of three books:

 The "universal history" knowledge of the day. It begins with Biblical history, followed by the history of Troy, Rome and the Middle Ages. It contains a natural history section and a comprehensive compilation of astronomy and geography. It addresses certain animal and bird species in-depth
Ethics: the thinking of modern and classical moralists and considers the vices and virtues that characterize humanity
 Matters related to "politics and the art of governing", that according to the author "it is the most honorable and the highest science, the noblest of professions on earth".

The artist's imagination fills the margin of 18 pages with arabesque that constitute one of the most highly developed and earliest series of this genre in the history of European Miniature. The illustration of natural history employs traditional layouts dating to Romanesque bestiary.

References

External links 
 Facsimile edition by M.Moleiro Editor, 1999, .

13th-century books
French literature
French-language works
Texts of medieval France